The Ecuadorian Popular Revolutionary Union (URPE) was a political coalition in Ecuador, formed in 1980 by the People's Committee and the Second Independence Movement. The two organizations constituting URPE had previously belonged to the Broad Left Front (FADI).

References

Political parties established in 1980
Political party alliances in Ecuador